Ben Scholte (born 10 August 2001) is a Dutch professional footballer who plays as a attacking midfielder for Eredivisie club FC Emmen.

Career
Scholte made his debut for FC Emmen in the 2020-21 season on the 22 December, 2020 against FC Utrecht appearing as a substitute for Nick Bakker in a 3-2 defeat at De Oude Meerdijk.

League title and promotion
He played 19 league games and opened his scoring account for the club in the 2021-22, he scored an injury time winner in a 2-1 victory when playing FC Dordrecht on the 10 December, 2021 at De Ouse Meerijk. The club would go on to win the Eerste Divisie and get promoted as champions. In June 2022, 10 years after first joining the club’s youth academy, Scholte was given a new contract with FC Emmen.

Honours
 Eerste Divisie
 Winner: 2021–22

References

2001 births
Living people
Dutch footballers
Eredivisie players
Eerste Divisie players